The ATP Challenger Series is the second-tier tour for professional tennis organised by the Association of Tennis Professionals (ATP). The 1978 ATP Challenger Series calendar comprises 18 tournaments with prize money of $25,000.

Schedule

January

June

July

August

September

October

November

Statistical information 
These tables present the number of singles (S) and doubles (D) titles won by each player and each nation during the season, within all the tournament categories of the 1978 ATP Challenger Series. The players/nations are sorted by: 1) total number of titles (a doubles title won by two players representing the same nation counts as only one win for the nation); 2) a singles > doubles hierarchy; 3) alphabetical order (by family names for players).

Titles won by player

Titles won by nation

See also 
 1978 Grand Prix
 Association of Tennis Professionals
 International Tennis Federation

References

External links 
 Official ATP World Tour Website: Results Archive
 ITF Tennis: Tournament Search

ATP Challenger Tour
1978 in tennis